The 2019 DXC Technology 600 was the ninth round of the 2019 IndyCar Series season, contested over 248 laps at the 1.5-mile (2.4 km) Texas Motor Speedway in Fort Worth, Texas. Takuma Sato claimed his second pole of the year, while Josef Newgarden claimed the 13th win of his career and his 3rd of the season.

Results

Qualifying

Race

Notes:
 Points include 1 point for leading at least 1 lap during a race, an additional 2 points for leading the most race laps, and 1 point for Pole Position.

Championship standings after the race

Drivers' Championship standings

Manufacturer standings

 Note: Only the top five positions are included.

References

2018
2019 in IndyCar
2019 in sports in Texas
2019 DXC Technology 600
June 2019 sports events in the United States